Ebenezer Byron Finley (July 31, 1833 – August 21, 1916) was an American attorney and politician from Ohio. A Democrat, he was most notable for his service as a U.S. Representative from 1877 to 1881.

A native of Orrville, Ohio, Finley was educated in Orrville and worked at a variety of occupations prior to the American Civil War. In 1859, he commenced the study of law in the Bucyrus, Ohio office of his uncle, Stephen Ross Harris. He was admitted to the bar in 1861, but soon afterwards enlisted for the Civil War as a member of the Union Army's 64th Ohio Infantry Regiment. Appointed a first lieutenant in the regiment's Company K, Finley served for a year and took part in several battles before being discharged after he was injured in an accident. He settled in Bucyrus, where he established a successful law practice.

Finley was active in politics as a Democrat and served as mayor of Bucyrus from 1863 to 1865. He won election to the U.S. House in 1876 and served two terms, 1877 to 1881. During his second term he was chairman of the House's Committee on Public Expenditures. He declined to run for another term in 1880, and resumed practicing law in Bucyrus. From 1884 to 1886, he served as adjutant general of the Ohio National Guard with the rank of major general.

Finley died in Bucyrus on August 21, 1916. He was buried at Oakwood Cemetery in Bucyrus.

Early life
Finley was born in Orrville, Ohio, the son of William Finley and Rhoda (Harris) Finley. Finley was raised and educated in Orrville, and worked at a variety of occupations, including teaching school in Illinois, boatman on the Illinois and Mississippi Rivers, and crew member on Great Lakes cargo ships. In February 1858, he married Charlotte E. Codding (1841–1929). They were the parents of a son, Harry M. Finley (1859–1882). In 1859, he began to study law in the Bucyrus, Ohio office of Stephen Ross Harris, who was his uncle. He was admitted to the bar in 1861, and began to practice in Bucyrus.

Soon after he began practicing law, Finley joined the Union Army for the American Civil War. He was active in recruiting Company K, 64th Ohio Infantry Regiment, in which he served as a first lieutenant He took part in several engagements, including the April 1862 Battle of Shiloh. Finley was injured in an accident, so he returned to Ohio to recuperate. He was mustered out of his company in July 1862, resigned in August, and was discharged in September.

After the war, Finley was active in veterans' organizations, including the Grand Army of the Republic and Society of the Army of the Cumberland and continued to practice law in Bucyrus. Among the prospective attorneys who studied under Finley was Edward Vollrath. He served as mayor of the village of Bucyrus from 1863 to 1865.

Later life

A Democrat, in 1876 Finley was elected to the United States House of Representatives. He was reelected in 1878, and served in the 45th and 46th Congresses (March 4, 1877 – March 3, 1881). In his second term, Finley was chairman of the House Committee on Public Expenditures. He was not a candidate for re-nomination in 1880 and resumed practicing law in Bucyrus.

In January 1884, Finley was appointed Adjutant General of Ohio. He was commissioned as a major general and served until 1886. In 1886, he was selected to serve as permanent chairman of the state Democratic convention.

Finley won a November 1896 election to fill a vacant seat as circuit court judge for Ohio's Third Circuit, and he served until February 1897. He was an at-large delegate to the 1896 Democratic National Convention.

Finley died in Bucyrus on August 21, 1916. He was buried at Oakwood Cemetery in Bucyrus.

Notes

References

Sources

1833 births
1916 deaths
People from Orrville, Ohio
People from Bucyrus, Ohio
Union Army officers
People of Ohio in the American Civil War
Ohio lawyers
Ohio state court judges
Democratic Party members of the United States House of Representatives from Ohio
19th-century American politicians
19th-century American judges
19th-century American lawyers